Alfredo Ghierra (31 August 1891 – 16 November 1973) was an Uruguayan footballer who played for the Uruguay national team.

He was a member of the squads which won the gold medal in the 1924 Olympics, as well as the South American Championship (today's Copa América) three consecutive times: 1923, 1924 and 1926 (they withdrew from the 1925 edition).

Ghierra played club football for Universal and Nacional.

References

External links

 

1891 births
1973 deaths
Uruguayan people of Italian descent
Uruguayan footballers
Footballers at the 1924 Summer Olympics
Olympic footballers of Uruguay
Olympic gold medalists for Uruguay
Uruguay international footballers
Defensor Sporting players
Club Nacional de Football players
Olympic medalists in football
Copa América-winning players
Medalists at the 1924 Summer Olympics

Association football midfielders